Popidiot is an Estonian band.

In 2009, the band won several awards in Estonian Music Awards, including in the category "best band of the year" and "best video of the year".

Members
Hendrik Luuk
Matti Peura

Discography

Albums
2005: "1111" (Seksound)
2009: "Friday's Remixes" (Seksound)
2009: "Antenna Of Love" (Seksound)

References

Estonian musical groups